Nway Kandar Oo is a 2018 Burmese drama television series. It aired on MRTV-4, from April 5 to 30, 2018, on Mondays to Fridays at 19:00 for 18 episodes.

Cast
Sithu Win as Hnin Ngwe
Phyu Thant Chaw as Nu Nu Nge
Ye Aung as U Myat Min
Htun Eaindra Bo as Daw Thaung Nu
Aung Paing as Ba Khet
Nan Shwe Yi as Nyunt May
Mya Hnin Yee Lwin as Moe Thu
Thuta Aung as Thar Kyaw
Lu Mone as U Lay Kan
Shwe Eain Min as Sein Gwat
Kyaw Thet Wai
Khin Moht Moht Aye

References

Burmese television series
MRTV (TV network) original programming